The 2021 FINA Marathon Swim World Series began on 13 March with the first stage in Doha, Qatar and ended at the last stage on 16 December 2021 in Abu Dhabi, United Arab Emirates. It was the 15th edition of the FINA-sanctioned series, and included nine events.

A 4×1500 metre mixed relay event was debuted as part of the Abu Dhabi Aquatics Festival at the final leg of the World Series.

Point system and prize money

Leg Prize Money

Calendar

The calendar for the 2021 series, announced by FINA.

Medal summary

Men

Women

Medal table

References

External links

Official website

FINA Marathon Swim World Series
FINA Marathon Swim World Series